Carla Constanza Peterson (born 6 April 1974) is an Argentine actress.

Biography 
Carla Constanza Peterson was born in Córdoba, Argentina on April 6, 1974 and there she lived the first two years of her life. Carla Peterson is the daughter of a Commodore of the Argentine Air Force and a lawyer she is descended from Swedes through her father and Italians through her mother. Carla Peterson is the oldest of three siblings.

Personal life 
She married Argentine politician Martín Lousteau in New Haven, Connecticut in September 2011. On January 26, 2013, she gave birth to the couple's first child, a boy, whom they called Gaspar, who was born in the Clínica Maternidad Suizo Argentina.

Career 
At 18 years old Carla Peterson moved a couple of months to New York and Los Angeles to take dance classes. Two years later she appeared in a television casting and was chosen to participate in Montaña rusa. 

In 1996, she was part of the cast of the television series Por siempre mujercitas. 

In 1997, she was part of the cast of the television series Naranja y media. 

From 1999 to 2000, she was part of the cast of the youth television series Verano del '98. 

In 2001, she was part of the cast of the television series EnAmorArte. 

From 2002 to 2003, she was part of the cast of the television series Son amores. 

In 2004, she was part of the cast of the television series La niñera. In 2004, she was part of the cast of the television series Los pensionados. 

In 2005, she was a principle antagonist in the telenovela Amarte así. In 2005, she makes a small participation in the television series Mujeres asesinas. 

From 2006 to 2007, she was part of the cast of the television series Sos mi vida. 

From 2007 to 2008, she was the protagonist of the television series  Lalola with Luciano Castro. 

From 2008 to 2009, she was the protagonist of the television series Los exitosos Pells with Mike Amigorena.

In 2010 she acted in the movie El mural. 

In 2011, she was the protagonist of the television series Un año para recordar with Gastón Pauls. In 2011, she was part of the cast of the television series Los únicos. In 2011 she acted in the movie Medianeras. 

In 2012 she acted in the movie 2+2. 

From 2012 to 2013, she was one of the protagonist of the television series Tiempos compulsivos. 

In 2013, she was one of the protagonist of the television series En terapia. 

In 2014 she acted in the movie Las insoladas. 

From 2014 to 2015, she was the protagonist of the television series Guapas with  Mercedes Morán, Araceli González, Isabel Macedo and Florencia Bertotti. 

In 2015, she was part of the cast of the television series Dispuesto a todo. 

In 2016 she, makes a small participation in the television series Educando a Nina. In 2016 she acted in the movie Una noche de amor. In 2016 she acted in the movie Inseparables. 

In 2017 she acted in the movie Mamá se fue de viaje. 

In 2018, she was the protagonist of the television series 100 días para enamorarse. In 2018, she was part of the cast of the television series Edha. In 2018 she acted in the movie Recreo. In 2018 she acted in the drama thriller Animal. 

In 2019, she was part of the cast of the television series Reacción en cadena.

Filmography

Television

Theater

Movies

Videoclips

Awards and nominations

References

External links
 Official Website
 

1974 births
Argentine people of Swedish descent
Argentine people of Italian descent
20th-century Argentine actresses
Argentine telenovela actresses
Living people
21st-century Argentine actresses
Argentine stage actresses